Michael Hearn may refer to:

 Michael Patrick Hearn, American literary scholar 
 Michael Louis Hearn (1866–1931), Irish member of the Parliament of the United Kingdom